Gonocalyx is a genus of flowering plants belonging to the family Ericaceae.

Its native range is Costa Rica to Colombia, Caribbean.

Species:

Gonocalyx almedae 
Gonocalyx amplexicaulis 
Gonocalyx concolor 
Gonocalyx costaricensis 
Gonocalyx lilliae 
Gonocalyx megabracteolatus 
Gonocalyx portoricensis 
Gonocalyx pterocarpus 
Gonocalyx pulcher 
Gonocalyx smilacifolius 
Gonocalyx tetrapterus

References

Ericaceae
Ericaceae genera